Vydrino is a rural locality (a village) in Pyatovskoye Rural Settlement, Totemsky District, Vologda Oblast, Russia. The population was 74 as of 2002.

Geography 
Vydrino is located 2 km southwest of Totma (the district's administrative centre) by road. Savino is the nearest rural locality.

References 

Rural localities in Tarnogsky District